Chiloglanis polypogon is a species of upside-down catfish endemic to Cameroon where it occurs in the Cross River.  It may also occur in Nigeria.  This species grows to a length of  SL.

References

External links 

polypogon
Freshwater fish of Africa
Fish of Cameroon
Endemic fauna of Cameroon
Fish described in 1989